Happy Go Lucky is a 1936 American musical film directed by Aubrey Scotto and written by Olive Cooper. The film stars Phil Regan, Evelyn Venable, Jed Prouty, William Newell, Jonathan Hale and Harlan Briggs. The film was released on December 14, 1936. by Republic Pictures.

Plot

Cast
Phil Regan as John L. 'Happy Jack' Cole / Bill Lyons
Evelyn Venable as Mary Gorham
Jed Prouty as Charles Gorham
William Newell as Charlie Davis
Jonathan Hale as J. Lansing Bennett
Harlan Briggs as U.S. Consul E.R. Brown
Stanley Andrews as Capt. Matzdorf 
Claude King as Col. Wallis
Carleton Young as Al
Karl Hackett as Porozzi
Guy Kingsford as Joe
Howard Hickman as Dr. Wilson
Willie Fung as Coolie Fisherman

References

External links
 

1936 films
American musical films
1936 musical films
Republic Pictures films
Films directed by Aubrey Scotto
American black-and-white films
Films produced by Nat Levine
Films scored by Karl Hajos
1930s English-language films
1930s American films